Henicopsaltria kelsalli, commonly known as the Cape York grinder, is a large species of cicada native to the Cape York Peninsula in northeastern Australia.

References

External links

Hemiptera of Australia
Insects described in 1910
Arenopsaltriini